Sirk'i (Aymara for wart, also spelled Serkhe, also named Tacaneri or Takañeri) is a  mountain in the Andes of Bolivia. It is situated in the Potosí Department, Antonio Quijarro Province, Tomave Municipality, about 14 km north of the Jatun Mundo Quri Warani (Nuevo Mundo) volcano. Sirk'i lies southwest of Kunturiri Mayqu and west of Ch'iyar Jaqhi.

See also 
 Kuntur Chukuña

References 

Mountains of Potosí Department